Zhanang County or Dranang County, (Tibetan: གྲ་ནང་རྫོང་ Wylie gra nang rdzong; Chinese: 扎囊县; Pinyin: Zhānáng Xiàn)  is a county of Shannan (Lhokha) in the Tibet Autonomous Region. 
The capital town of county is Dratang town, with a monastery named Dratang.

Dranang County is home to Samye Monastery, the first Buddhist monastery in Tibet, and many other monasteries, including Mindrolling Monastery. 
Dranang County is separated into northern and southern parts by the Yarlung Tsangpo River. In 2015 a bridge near Dratang Town was finished, connecting the northern and southern parts of the county. Until 2015 there were regular rafts for transportation of people or small goods.

Demographics
As of 2000 it had a population of 35,278.

References

Counties of Tibet
Shannan, Tibet